Lionel Alfred William Atwill (1 March 1885 – 22 April 1946) was an English stage and screen actor. He began his acting career at the Garrick Theatre. After coming to the U.S., he subsequently appeared in various Broadway plays and Hollywood films. Some of his more significant roles were in Captain Blood (1935), Son of Frankenstein (1939) and To Be or Not to Be (1942).

Life and career

Atwill was born on 1 March 1885 in Croydon, London, England. He studied architecture before his stage debut at the Garrick Theatre, London, in 1904.

He became a star in Broadway theatre by 1918 and made his screen debut in 1919. His Broadway credits include The Lodger (1916), The Silent Witness (1930), Fioretta (1928), The Outsider (1924), Napoleon (1927), The Thief (1926), Slaves All (1926), Beau Gallant (1925), Caesar and Cleopatra (1924), The Outsider (1923), The Comedian (1922), The Grand Duke (1921), Deburau (1920), Tiger! Tiger! (1918), Another Man's Shoes (1918), A Doll's House (1917), Hedda Gabler (1917), The Wild Duck (1917), The Indestructible Wife (1917), L'elevation (1917), and Eve's Daughter (1917).

He acted on the stage in Australia and then became involved in U.S. horror films in the 1930s, including leading roles in Doctor X (1932), The Vampire Bat, Murders in the Zoo and Mystery of the Wax Museum (all 1933), and perhaps most memorably as the one-armed Inspector Krogh in Son of Frankenstein (1939),  a role famously parodied by Kenneth Mars in Mel Brooks' 1974 satire Young Frankenstein. He appeared in four subsequent Universal Frankenstein films as well as many other of the studio's beloved chillers.

His other roles include a romantic lead opposite Marlene Dietrich in Josef von Sternberg's The Devil Is a Woman (1935), a crooked insurance investigator in The Wrong Road (1937) for RKO, Dr. James Mortimer in 20th Century Fox's film version of The Hound of the Baskervilles (1939), and Professor Moriarty in the Universal Studios film Sherlock Holmes and the Secret Weapon (1943). He also had a rare comedy role in Ernst Lubitsch's 1942 classic To Be or Not to Be and that same year menaced Abbott and Costello in Pardon My Sarong.

Personal life

Atwill married four times. His first wife was Phyllis Ralph; the couple married in 1913 and divorced in 1919. In 1941, their son John Arthur Atwill (born 1914) was killed in action at age 26. Atwill married the actress Elsie Mackay in 1920. He married Louise Cromwell Brooks in 1930 after her divorce from General of the Army Douglas MacArthur; they divorced in 1943. Atwill married Paula Pruter in 1944, and their marriage continued until his death. Their son, Lionel Anthony Atwill, is a retired writer.

In 1942, Atwill was indicted for perjury by a jury investigating the 1941 proceeding of a grand jury relative to the alleged occurrence of a sex orgy at his home. He was given five years probation, but Hollywood producers and other executives blacklisted him for minor criminal activity. He made small film appearances afterward.

Atwill died on 22 April 1946, as a result of lung cancer and pneumonia at his home in Pacific Palisades, Los Angeles.

Filmography

Eve's Daughter (1918) - Courtenay Urquhart
For Sale (1918) - Minor Role
The Marriage Price (1919) - Kenneth Gordon
The Eternal Mother (1920) - Howard Hollister
The Highest Bidder (1921) - Lester
The Silent Witness (1932) - Sir Austin Howard
Doctor X (1932) - Dr. Jerry Xavier
The Vampire Bat (1933) - Dr. Otto von Niemann
The Secret of Madame Blanche (1933) - Aubrey St. John
Mystery of the Wax Museum (1933) - Ivan Igor
Murders in the Zoo (1933) - Eric Gorman
The Sphinx (1933) - Jerome Breen
The Song of Songs (1933) - Baron von Merzbach
Secret of the Blue Room (1933) - Robert von Helldorf
The Solitaire Man (1933) - Inspector Wallace
Nana (1934) - Colonel André Muffat
Beggars in Ermine (1934) - John 'Flint' Dawson aka John Daniels
Stamboul Quest (1934) - Herr Von Sturm
One More River (1934) - Brough
The Age of Innocence (1934) - Julius Beaufort
The Firebird (1934) - John Pointer
The Man Who Reclaimed His Head (1934) - Henry Dumont
The Devil Is a Woman (1935) - Capt. Don Pasqual 'Pasqualito' Costelar
Mark of the Vampire (1935) - Inspector Neumann
The Murder Man (1935) - Captain Cole
Rendezvous (1935) - Major William Brennan
Captain Blood (1935) - Colonel Bishop
Lady of Secrets (1936) - Mr. Whittaker
Till We Meet Again (1936) - Ludwig
Absolute Quiet (1936) - G.A. Axton
The High Command (1937) - Maj. Gen. Sir John Sangye, VC
The Road Back (1937) - Prosecutor
The Last Train from Madrid (1937) - Col. Vigo
Lancer Spy (1937) - Col. Fenwick
The Wrong Road (1937) - Mike Roberts
The Great Garrick (1937) - Beaumarchais
Three Comrades (1938) - Breuer
The Great Waltz (1938) - Count Hohenfried
Son of Frankenstein (1939) - Inspector Krogh
The Three Musketeers (1939) - De Rochefort
The Hound of the Baskervilles (1939) - James Mortimer M.D.
The Gorilla (1939) - Walter Stevens
The Sun Never Sets (1939) - Zurof
Mr. Moto Takes a Vacation (1939) - Prof. Roger Chauncey Hildebrand
The Secret of Dr. Kildare (1939) - Paul Messenger
Balalaika (1939) - Prof. Marakov
The Mad Empress (1939) - General Bazaine
Charlie Chan in Panama (1940) - Cliveden Compton
Johnny Apollo (1940) - Jim McLaughlin
Charlie Chan's Murder Cruise (1940) - Dr. Suderman
Girl in 313 (1940) - Russell aka Henry Woodruff
The Great Profile (1940) - Dr. Bruce
Boom Town (1940) - Harry Compton
Man Made Monster (1941, re-released as The Atomic Monster) - Dr. Paul Rigas
To Be or Not to Be (1942) - Rawitch
The Mad Doctor of Market Street (1942) - Graham / Dr. Ralph Benson
The Ghost of Frankenstein (1942) - Doctor Theodore Bohmer
The Strange Case of Doctor Rx (1942) - Dr. Fish
Junior G-Men of the Air (1942, Serial) - The Baron
Pardon My Sarong (1942) - Varnoff
Cairo (1942) - Teutonic Gentleman
Night Monster (1942) - Dr. King
Sherlock Holmes and the Secret Weapon (1943) - Moriarty
Frankenstein Meets the Wolf Man (1943) - Mayor
Captain America (1944, Serial) - Cyrus Maldor
Lady in the Death House (1944) - Charles Finch
Raiders of Ghost City (1944, Serial) - Erich von Rugen, alias Alex Morel
Secrets of Scotland Yard (1944) - Waterlow
House of Frankenstein (1944) - Inspector Arnz
Fog Island (1945) - Alec Ritchfield
Crime, Inc. (1945) - Pat Coyle
House of Dracula (1945) - Police Inspector Holtz
Lost City of the Jungle (1946, Serial) - Sir Eric Hazarias
Genius at Work (1946) - Latimer Marsh / The Cobra (final film role)

References

Further reading

External links

 
 

1885 births
1946 deaths
Deaths from pneumonia in California
English male film actors
English male silent film actors
English male stage actors
People from Croydon
20th-century English male actors
British expatriate male actors in the United States
Deaths from lung cancer in California